This page gathers the results of elections in Poitou-Charentes.

Regional elections

Last regional election

In the last regional election, which took place on March 21 and March 28, 2004, Ségolène Royal (PS) was elected President, defeating incumbent Élisabeth Morin (UMP).